Marie Knight (née Roach; June 1, 1920 – August 30, 2009) was an American gospel and R&B singer.

Life and career
She was born Marie Roach in 1920, though she claimed to have been born in 1925.   Sources differ as to her place of birth – either Attapulgus, Georgia, or Sanford, Florida – but she grew up in Newark, New Jersey.  Her father was a construction worker and the family were members of the Church of God in Christ. She first toured as a singer in 1939 with Frances Robinson, an evangelist. She married preacher Albert Knight in 1941 but the union ended in divorce. While she was touring with Sister Rosetta in the 1940s, her two children died in a fire at her mother's house in New Jersey.

In 1946, she made her first recordings, for Haven Records with the masters soon purchased by Signature Records, as a member of The Sunset Four (aka The Sunset Jubilee Singers). Shortly afterwards, Sister Rosetta Tharpe saw her singing at the Golden Gate Auditorium in Harlem, on a bill with Mahalia Jackson, and invited Knight to join her on tour. Tharpe recognized "something special" in Marie's contralto voice.

She continued to record and perform with Tharpe through the 1940s, sometimes acting out the parts of "the Saint and the Sinner", with Tharpe as the saint and Knight as the sinner. Among their successes were the songs "Beams of Heaven", "Didn't it Rain", and "Up Above My Head", recorded for Decca Records. "Up Above My Head", credited jointly to both singers, reached No. 6 on the US R&B chart at the end of 1948, and Knight's solo version of "Gospel Train" reached No. 9 on the R&B chart in 1949.

She left Tharpe to go solo around 1951, and put together a backing group, The Millionaires (Thomasina Stewart, Eleonore King and Roberta Jones), with whom she recorded the 1956 album Songs of the Gospel. She began recording secular R&B music in the late 1950s, for various labels including Decca, Mercury, and Okeh. Her duet with Rex Garvin, credited as Marie & Rex, "I Can't Sit Down" released on the Carlton label, reached No. 94 on the pop chart in 1959. In the late 1950s she also toured Britain as a guest of Humphrey Lyttelton.

In 1961 she recorded the single "Come Tomorrow", which was later a hit for Manfred Mann. Knight's version of "Cry Me a River" reached No. 35 on the U.S. Billboard R&B charts in 1965.

She toured with Brook Benton, the Drifters, and Clyde McPhatter, and regularly reunited onstage with Tharpe. She remained friends with Tharpe, and helped arrange her funeral in 1973. In 1975, having given up performing secular music, she recorded another gospel album, Marie Knight: Today. In 2002, Knight made a comeback in the gospel world, recording for a tribute album to Tharpe. She released a full-length album, Let Us Get Together, on her manager's label in 2007.

Death
Marie Knight died in Harlem of complications from pneumonia, on August 30, 2009, aged 89. She was survived by a sister, Bernice Henry.

Discography

Marie Knight with The Sunset Four, Male Quartet (aka Sunset Jubilee Singers)
 1946 Signature 32004 - If I Could Just Make It In / Where Shall I Go
 1946 Signature 32005 - I'll Let Nothing Separate Me ... / I Just Couldn't Keep It To Myself
 1946 Haven 501 - I Just Couldn't Keep It To Myself / The Negro National Anthem
 1946 Signature 32006 - Negro National Anthem / Where Could I Go But To The Lord
 1946 Haven 502 - I'll Let Nothing Separate Me ... / Where Could I Go
 1946 Signature 32007 - The Lord Will Make A Way / I'll Never Turn Back No More
 1946 Haven 503 - I'll Never Turn Back No More / The Lord Will Make A Way
 1946 Haven 504 - Today / Something Within Me Banishes Pain

Sister Marie Knight
 1946 Signature 32008 - Just A Closer Walk With Thee / The Land Beyond The River
 1946 Signature 32009 - When I Get To The End Of My Journey / What Could I Do

Georgia Peach/Marie Knight
 1946 Signature 32024 - I Just Rose To Tell You / Today; flip side only by Marie Knight.

Marie Knight
 1947 Haven 516 - Just A Closer Walk With Thee / The Land Beyond The River
 1947 Haven 517 - The End Of My Journey / What Could I Do

Marie Knight
 circa 1947 RCA Victor 22-0073 - Misery Blues
 circa 1947 RCA Victor 22-0073 - Rock With It

Sister Rosetta Tharpe and Marie Knight; Sam Price Trio / Sister Rosetta Tharpe; Sam Price Trio
 1947 Decca 48043 - Oh When I Come To The End Of My Journey / This Train; flip side only by Sister Rosetta Tharpe; Sam Price Trio.

Sister Rosetta Tharpe; Marie Knight; Sam Price Trio
 1947 Decca 48054 - Stretch Out / Didn't It Rain

Sister Rosetta Tharpe and Marie Knight; Sam Price Trio
 1948 Decca 48070 - Beams Of Heaven / Precious Memories

Marie Knight; Sam Price Trio
1948 Decca 48072 - What Could I Do / I Must See Jesus

Marie Knight With The Sam Price Trio
 1948 Decca 48084 - The Land Beyond The River / My Heavenly Father Watches Over Me

Sister Rosetta Tharpe and Marie Knight with The Sam Price Trio (members Sister Rosetta Tharpe (vocals and guitar), Marie Knight (vocals), Sammy Price (piano), George "Pops" Foster (bass) and Wallace Bishop (drums))

 1948 Decca  48090 - Up Above My Head I Hear Music In The Air* / My Journey To The Sky; *recorded 1947

Marie Knight with The Dependable Boys; Sam Price Trio / Marie Knight; Sam Price Trio
 1949 Decca 48092 - Gospel Train / Behold His Face; flip side only by Marie Knight; Sam Price Trio.

Sister Rosetta Tharpe and M. K. / Sister Rosetta Tharpe and Marie Knight
 1949 Decca 48098 - He Watches Me / He's All I Need; flip side only by Sister Rosetta Tharpe and Marie Knight.

Marie Knight With Sam Price Trio
 1949 Decca 48102 - I Can't Forget It, Can You / Up In My Heavenly Home

Sister Marie Knight with The Sunset Four
 1949 Candy 4000 - The Negro National Anthem / I Just Couldn't Keep It To Myself

Sister Marie Knight
 1949 Candy 4001 - I'll Let Nothing Separate Me ... / Where Could I Go But To The Lord

Marie Knight
 1949 Candy 4002 - I'll Never Turn Back No More / The Lord Will Make A Way
 1949 Candy 4003 - Today / Something Within Me Banishes Pain
 1949 Candy 4004 - Just A Closer Walk With Thee / The Land Beyond The River
 1949 Candy 4010 - The End Of My Journey / What Could I Do

Marie Knight And Vivian Cooper; With Sam Price Trio
 1949 Decca 48111 - Out Of The Depth / Touch Me Lord Jesus

Marie Knight With The Sam Price Trio
 1949 Decca 48120 - I Must Have Jesus All The Time / I Thank You Jesus

Marie Knight
 1950 Decca 48128 - Jesus Loves Me / Whispering Hope

Marie Knight With The Sam Price Trio
 1950 Decca 48147 - Live The Life / Seal Of Heaven
 1950 Decca 48173 - Lord Search My Heart / In Shaded Green Pastures
 1950 Decca 48189 - The Florida Storm / Hallelujah What A Storm

Sister Rosetta & Marie Knight
 1950 Decca 48194 - I Shall Know Him / I Was Healed

"Jersey Joe" Walcott and Maria Knight
 1950 Decca 14594 - Have Faith / Say A Little Prayer

Marie Knight
 1951 Decca 48198 - I Heard My Mother Pray / Don't Miss That Train
 1951 Decca 48219 - Satisfied With Jesus / The Old Rugged Cross

Sister Rosetta And Marie Knight With The Sam Price Trio
 1951 Decca 48227 - Milky White Way / His Eye Is On The Sparrow

Marie Knight
 1951 Decca 48233 - Every Day Every Hour / My Expectations
 1951 Decca 48253 - On The Battlefield / I'll Fly Away
 1951 Decca 48262 - Adeste Fideles (O, Come All Ye Faithful) / It Came Upon The Midnight Clear
 1952 Decca 48285 - Sit Down Servant / Does Jesus Care
 1952 Decca 28128 - Wildwood / He's My Light(with The Anita Kerr Sisters)

Sister Rosetta T. & Marie Knight
 1952 Decca 28509 - There Is A Highway To Heaven / I'm Bound For Higher Grounds

Sister Rosetta Tharpe And Marie Knight
 1952 Decca 9-28625 - Old Landmark / Pressing On

Marie Knight With The Nightingales
 1953 Brunswick 05071 - The Old Rugged Cross / Satisfied With Jesus

Marie Knight
 1953 Decca 28545 - Jesus Walk With Me / Get Away Jordan
 1953 Decca 48298 - I Just Can't Keep From Cryin' / On My Appointed Time
 1953 Decca 48301 - Let Go His Hand / Let's Go On
 1954 Decca 48308 - Calvary / God Spoke To Me

Sister Rosetta & Marie Knight
 1954 Decca 48309 - Nobody's Fault But Mine / Shadrack

Marie Knight; Leroy Kirkland and his Orchestra
 1954 Decca 48315 - You Got A Way Of Making Love / I Know Every Move You Make

Marie Knight
 1954 Decca 48320 - This Old Soul Of Mine / I Tell It Wherever I Go
 1954 Decca 48326 - I'm Troubled / Stop Now, It's Praying Time
 1954 Decca 48327 - Trouble In Mind / What More Can I Do
 1955 Decca 48333 - Who Rolled The Stone Away / Easter Bells
 1955 Decca 48334 - The Battle Of Jericho / A Travelers Tune
 1955 Decca 48336 - I Must Tell Jesus / The Storm Is Passing Over

Marie Knight with The Griffins
 1956 Wing 90069 - As Long As I Love / Tell Me Why

Marie Knight
 1956 Mercury 70904 - Stand By Me / Blessed Be The Lord
 1956 Mercury 70969 - Grasshopper Baby / Look At Me

Marie Knight & The Millionaires
 1956 Mercury MG 20196 Sings The Gospel (LP)

Marie Knight With The Howard Biggs Orch.
 1957 Mercury 71055 - I'm A Little Fooler / Am I Reaching For The Moon

Marie Knight; Teacho Wiltshire Orchestra
 1958 Baton 253 - I Thought I Told You Not To Tell Them / September Song

Marie And Rex:  Marie Knight and Rex Garvin with orchestral accomp. / Marie Knight with orch.
 1959 Carlton 502 - I Can't Sit Down / Miracles; flip side only by Marie Knight with orch.

Marie Knight
 1960 Addit 1016 - Hope You Won't Hold It Against Me / To Be Loved By You

Marie Knight & Junior Lewis
 1960 Sylvia - Better Wait And See - (unissued; released in U. K. 2002 Kent CD "The Arock & Sylvia Story" CDKEND 212)

Marie Knight
 1960 Sylvia - Come Tomorrow - (unissued; released in UK 2002 Kent CD "The Arock & Sylvia Story" CDKEND 212)
 1961 Okeh 4-7141 - Come Tomorrow* / Nothing In The World
 1962 Okeh 4-7147 - Come On Baby (Hold My Hand) / What Kind Of Fool (Do You Think I Am)
 1963 Diamond 136 - I Was Born Again / I Don't Wanna Walk Alone
 1963 Diamond 149 - The Nearness Of You / Walk Away
 1964 Diamond 171 - Make Yourself At Home / I Was Born Again
 1964 Musicor 1076 - Comes The Night / Cry Me A River
 1964 Musicor 1106 - That's No Way To Treat A Girl / Say It Again
 1964 That's No Way To Treat A Girl (full length version released in UK 2002 Kent LP Soul Spin - Kent 024)
 1964 Musicor 1128 - A Little Too Lonely / You Lie So Well
 1965 Okeh 4-7218 - Come Tomorrow / Nothing In The World
 1975 Blues Alliance 257004 - Today LP
 2001 Westside  - Bluesoul Belles Vol. 4: Scepter & Musicor Recordings (Compilation; Judy Clay, Marie Knight)
 2002 Gospel Friend - Hallelujah What a Song (Compilation)
 2007 M. C. Records MC-0058 - Let Us Get Together LP

References

1920 births
2009 deaths
20th-century American singers
21st-century American singers
20th-century African-American women singers
American gospel singers
Deaths from pneumonia in New York City
Musicians from Newark, New Jersey
20th-century American women singers
21st-century American women singers
21st-century African-American women singers